Eckart Johannes Wagner (4 July 1938 – 31 October 2002) was a German sailor who competed in the 1960 Summer Olympics, in the 1964 Summer Olympics, and in the 1968 Summer Olympics. He was born in Kiel.

References

1938 births
2002 deaths
German male sailors (sport)
Olympic sailors of the United Team of Germany
Olympic sailors of West Germany
Sailors at the 1960 Summer Olympics – Star
Sailors at the 1964 Summer Olympics – 5.5 Metre
Sailors at the 1968 Summer Olympics – Star
Sportspeople from Kiel